Retiring the number of an athlete is an honor a team bestows upon a player, usually after the player has left the team, retires from the sport, or dies, by taking his or her former number out of circulation. Once a number is retired, no future player from the team may wear that number on their uniform, unless the player so-honored permits it; however, in many cases the number cannot be used at all. Such an honor may also be bestowed on players who had highly memorable careers, died prematurely under tragic circumstances, or have had their promising careers ended by serious injury. Some sports that retire team numbers include baseball, cricket, ice hockey, basketball, American football, and association football. Retired jerseys are often referred to as "hanging from the rafters" as they are, literally, put to hang in the team's home venue.

The first number officially retired by a team in a professional sport was that of ice hockey player Ace Bailey, whose number 6 was retired by the Toronto Maple Leafs in 1934. Some teams have also retired number 12 in honor of their fans, or the "twelfth man". Similarly, the Sacramento Kings and Orlando Magic retired number 6 in honor of their fans, the "sixth man". In some cases, a team may decide to retire a number in honor of tragedies involving the team's city or state. For example, the number 58 was retired in 2018 by the Vegas Golden Knights hockey team in honor of the 58 victims killed in the 2017 Las Vegas shooting.

North American sports leagues

If a jersey is retired and an active player is still wearing it, the player is usually permitted to wear the number for his entire career as a player. If in the sport, managers and coaches wear uniform numbers, and the player later becomes a coach for the same team, he is also permitted to wear it as a coach.

However, in some cases the player may elect to change their number. For instance, in 1987 the Boston Bruins of the National Hockey League decided to retire jersey number 7 in honour of Phil Esposito, who had become a star while playing for the team. At the time #7 belonged to Ray Bourque, who was the Bruins' captain and had become a star in his own right. On the night of the ceremony honouring Esposito, Bourque took to the ice wearing his normal #7 jersey, which he had worn since breaking into the league in 1979. He skated over to the Hall of Famer, took off his #7 jersey and handed it to Esposito in what was referred to as Bourque's "surrendering" of #7 to Esposito. Underneath was a jersey numbered 77, which would become as associated with Bourque as #7 had been with Esposito in Boston.  Bourque's new jersey number would eventually join Esposito's in the rafters of TD Garden, as the Bruins retired his #77 following his 2001 retirement.

In rare cases, a number may be retired because of the player's endeavors in other fields. For example, former college football star Gerald Ford's number 48 was retired by the University of Michigan football squad by virtue of his future career as the 38th President of the United States.

Teams also take numbers out of circulation without formally retiring them, though it is generally understood that those numbers will never be issued again.  For example, the Pittsburgh Steelers have only officially retired three numbers: Ernie Stautner's #70, Joe Greene's #75 and Franco Harris' #32.  However, they have not reissued the numbers of several of their greatest players since they retired, and it is understood that no Steeler will ever wear them again. For example, Greene's #75 had not been reissued since Greene retired in 1981. Similarly, with the exception of a pair of quarterbacks in the mid-1980s, the Green Bay Packers have not re-issued Paul Hornung's number 5 since his departure from the team following the 1966 season. The Dallas Cowboys do not officially retire numbers, but it is generally understood that Roger Staubach's #12, Bob Lilly's #74, Troy Aikman's #8, and Emmitt Smith's #22 will never be issued again (though the Cowboys have occasionally used Lilly's 74 in the preseason). Additionally, after Peyton Manning was released by the Indianapolis Colts, owner Jim Irsay stated that no Colt will ever wear Manning's #18 again, though it was not officially retired until 2016. After his departure from the team in 2004, the Lakers removed Shaquille O'Neal's #34 from circulation, only officially retiring it in 2013.

Some teams either formally or informally take a jersey out of circulation when a player dies or has their career ended by serious injury or disease.  For instance, between 1934-2016, the Toronto Maple Leafs only retired a player's number if he experienced a career-ending incident while playing for the team.  As a result, they had only retired two jerseys in their history during that time; Ace Bailey's #6 was retired after he suffered a career-ending head injury and Bill Barilko's #5 was retired after his disappearance and presumed death on a fishing trip (his death was confirmed years later with the discovery of the wreckage of the plane on which he was flying).  The New York Yankees retired Lou Gehrig's #4 after he was forced to retire due to amyotrophic lateral sclerosis.  The New York Jets did not reissue the #90 of Dennis Byrd following a career ending neck injury, and it was understood long before its formal retirement in 2012 that no Jet would ever wear it again. Similarly, after Wayne Chrebet was forced to retire after suffering multiple concussions, the Jets took his #80 out of circulation but have not yet retired it; Byrd and Curtis Martin were the most recent Jets to have their numbers retired as both were done on the same day. After Magic Johnson retired because of his HIV disease, the Lakers retired his jersey #32.

In 2008, Princeton University retired the number 42 for all Princeton Tigers sports teams in honor of Bill Bradley and Heisman Trophy winner Dick Kazmaier. UCLA retired the same number in 2014 for all Bruins sports teams in honor of Jackie Robinson, who had played in four sports at the school prior to his Hall of Fame baseball career. Although Robinson never wore #42 at UCLA, the school chose it because of its indelible identification with Robinson.

In 2011, Michigan Wolverines football unretired all of the numbers that it had retired to create legends jerseys worn by its best players. The unretired jerseys were Bennie Oosterbaan's No. 47, Gerald Ford's No. 48, Ron Kramer's No. 87, The Wistert Brothers' (Whitey Wistert, Al Wistert, Alvin Wistert) No. 11 and Tom Harmon's No. 98. In 2015, the Legends program was discontinued, and the numbers re-retired.

On December 18, 2017, Kobe Bryant became the only player to have had two numbers (8, 24) retired by the same franchise, Los Angeles Lakers. Following Bryant's death, the Dallas Mavericks announced that number 24 would no longer be issued by the team (despite Bryant spending his entire career with the Lakers). While the number has not been issued since then, it is not honored in the rafters as an official retired number.

League-wide retirements
Three players in the major North American sports leagues have had their numbers retired by all teams in their respective leagues. Jackie Robinson, the first Black player in the modern era of Major League Baseball, had his number 42 retired league-wide in 1997. The only other exception to this retirement is on April 15, the anniversary of Robinson's MLB debut, when all uniformed personnel (players, managers, coaches, umpires) wear 42.

Wayne Gretzky, who retired as the National Hockey League's all-time leader in goals, points, and assists, had his number 99 retired league-wide at the 2000 NHL All-Star Game. On August 11, 2022, the NBA announced that it would retire Bill Russell's number 6 jersey league-wide, allowing players already wearing the number to continue to do so.

Association football

Some association football clubs have started doing this as squad numbers have become common. AS Roma, AC Milan, Ajax, Internazionale, Napoli, Manchester City, Lens, Lyon, Nantes and Swansea City have all retired shirt numbers; Milan retiring Franco Baresi's #6 shirt and Paolo Maldini's #3 shirt (with the caveat that one of Maldini's sons can wear the shirt if they play professionally for the club). Swansea retired the shirt number of Besian Idrizaj after he died in his sleep, of a suspected heart attack, at his family home in Linz, Austria. Manchester City, Lens and Lyon all retired the shirt number of Marc-Vivien Foé after his death on the field in the 2003 Confederations Cup; the Cameroon national team also attempted to retire Foé's number, but FIFA prevented them from doing so. FIFA also rejected an attempt by Argentina to retire the number #10 of Diego Maradona and an attempt by The Netherlands to retire the number #14 of Johan Cruyff.

Australian rules football
In Australian rules football, some clubs may exercise the right to retire a particular guernsey number, either to honour a past player or to simply cease use of the number. Examples include the Hawthorn Football Club, who retired their No. 1 guernsey prior to the beginning of the 2011 AFL season as the tribute to the fans, according to Max Bailey, the last person to wear the #1 guernsey, had his career cut short by multiple injuries to his right knee, and thanked the fans in his comeback attempts, and the Collingwood Football Club, who retired their No. 42 shirt in honour of Darren Millane, a Collingwood premiership player who was killed in a car crash in 1991.

Motorsport
In NASCAR, only once has a number been unofficially retired; that is in the Whelen Modified Tour, where number 61 is retired for Richie Evans after his death in 1985. NASCAR unofficially retired the number 3 in honour of Dale Earnhardt Sr. after his death on the track at the 2001 Daytona 500. Following his death, Earnhardt's old team changed to the number 29, and the replacement driver (Kevin Harvick) drove the 29 car through the 2013 season.  Dale Earnhardt Jr. made two special appearances in a number 3 car in the Busch Series in 2002 and again in the renamed Nationwide Series on 2 July 2010 at Daytona, but otherwise the number 3 was absent from all three national touring series until 2009, when Austin Dillon drove a number 3 in the Camping World Truck Series. Dillon is the grandson of Earnhardt's longtime friend and car owner Richard Childress, and he drives for Richard Childress Racing. After winning the Truck Series title in 2011, he drove the #3 car in the Nationwide Series in 2012 and 2013, and returned the number to the Cup Series in 2014 when he began competing full-time in that series for RCR. Ty Dillon, Austin's brother (another grandson of Childress), ran the number 3 in the Camping World Truck Series and began driving the number 3 in the Nationwide Series, now known as the Xfinity Series, in 2014.

From 2004 to 2006, drivers in the International Race of Champions used their numbers from their primary racing series. However, the #3 was retired as a result of Earnhardt's death and any driver who drove the #3 in their primary racing series would drive #03 instead. As such, Hélio Castroneves, who drives #3 in the IndyCar Series, drove the #03.

Following the 1989 24 Hours of Daytona, months after his fatal plane crash, IMSA retired Al Holbert's #14.

CART retired the use of #99 after the fatal accident of Greg Moore in 1999. However, since the IndyCar Series unification took place in 2008, that recognition has since been abandoned. For a brief time during the early-mid 1990s, CART unofficially retired #14 (in honor of A. J. Foyt), allowing it only to be carried only by an entry of A. J. Foyt Enterprises. After the open wheel split in 1996, the rule in CART competition was lifted.

Grand Prix motorcycle racing retired the use of #74 after the fatal accident of Daijiro Kato in 2003, #48 after the fatal accident of Shoya Tomizawa in 2010, #58 after the accident of Marco Simoncelli at the Sepang Circuit in 2011, and #39 after the death of Luis Salom at the Circuit de Catalunya in 2016. In January 2019, #69 was retired in honour of Nicky Hayden, who died in a cycling accident in May 2017. In 2021 number 50 was retired in honour of Jason Dupasquier who was killed after an accident at the Mugello Circuit

The Formula One World Championship, which has allowed drivers to choose their own number since the 2014 season, retired the use of #17 after the 2015 death of Jules Bianchi from critical injuries sustained in a crash at the 2014 Japanese Grand Prix.

The FIA Formula 2 Championship, formerly known as the GP2 Series, retired #19 after the death of Anthoine Hubert in a crash during the 2019 Spa-Francorchamps FIA Formula 2 round.

Cricket
Australian Cricket retired Phillip Hughes' One-Day International shirt number, 64, in remembrance of him, after his death during a match in 2014.

In 2017, BCCI retired unofficially Sachin Tendulkar's One-Day International shirt number 10.

Cricket Association of Nepal retired Paras Khadka's shirt number , 77, following the retirement of Country's most successful Captain in August 2021.

Rugby league
In other sports such as Rugby League and Rugby Union, despite the long history of the games, it used to be the case that because each number represents the particular positions on the field, the retirement of jersey numbers was impossible.  However, as more leagues have gone over the use of squad numbers the retirement of numbers is now possible.  The first recorded example in Rugby League was in May 2015 when Keighley Cougars withdrew number 6 following the death of Danny Jones during a match.

Following the death of former player Roger Millward, Hull Kingston Rovers withdrew the number 6 shirt Millward used to wear.  Terry Campese who had been allocated that number for 2016 was allocated squad number 32 instead.

In 2014, the Newcastle Knights retired the number 16 jersey for every game from Round 4, following a career-ending neck injury to Alex McKinnon that left him a quadriplegic.

Other sports
In Finnish ice hockey, if a player's number is retired, family members can use the retired number if they play for the same organization. Timo Nummelin had his number 3 retired by TPS, and later his son, Petteri Nummelin, wore number 3 for the team.

Following the death of Wouter Weylandt in the 2011 Giro d'Italia cycle race, organizers decided that they would not reassign Weylandt's bib number of 108 in future editions of the race.

In December 2020, following the death of professional wrestler Jon Huber, who wrestled under the ring name "Mr. Brodie Lee" in the American promotion All Elite Wrestling (AEW), the promotion retired the red strap version of the AEW TNT Championship belt that had been used up to that point in honor of Huber, who was the championship's second title holder; the belt was given to Huber's eldest son. A black strap version of the championship is now used.

In ceremonies before Germany's opening game of EuroBasket 2022 against France on September 2 in Cologne, the German Basketball Federation retired the #14 that almost-certain Hall of Famer Dirk Nowitzki had worn for the men's national team. A replica of Nowitzki's jersey will hang from the arena rafters at all future Germany men's home games.

See also
List of retired numbers
List of Canadian Football League retired numbers
List of Major League Baseball retired numbers
List of National Basketball Association retired numbers
List of National Football League retired numbers
List of National Hockey League retired numbers
List of retired numbers in association football

Footnotes

References

External link

Terminology used in multiple sports

Sports culture
Retirement
Numbering in sports
American football culture
Association football culture
Australian rules football culture
Baseball culture
Basketball culture
Cricket culture
Ice hockey culture
Rugby football culture